Heavens Above! is a 1963 British satirical comedy film starring Peter Sellers, directed by John and Roy Boulting, who also co-wrote along with Frank Harvey, from an idea by Malcolm Muggeridge. It is in a similar vein to the earlier collaboration between Sellers, Harvey and the Boultings, I'm All Right Jack.

Plot

A naive but caring prison chaplain, John Smallwood (Sellers), is accidentally assigned as vicar to the small and prosperous English country town of Orbiston Parva, in place of an upper-class cleric (Carmichael) with the same name, who is favoured by the Despard family, who practically run the town and operate a large factory there.

Smallwood's belief in charity and forgiveness sets him at odds with the locals, whose assertions that they are good, Christian people are belied in Smallwood's eyes by their behaviour and ideas. He creates social ructions by appointing a black dustman (Peters) as his churchwarden, taking in a gypsy family, and persuading local landowner Lady Despard (Jeans) to provide food for the church to distribute free to the people of the town.

His scheme spirals out of control and very soon the local traders are up in arms as they have lost all their customers. He tries to explain this to the residents but is besieged in the church hall and only just rescued by the police.

As a face-saving act, the Bishop appoints the 'original' Smallwood to the parish and assigns the 'troublemaker' to the Scottish island of 'Ultima Thule'. He is made 'Bishop of Outer Space' to the British space operations based there. But when the intended pilot of the first rocket gets cold feet, Smallwood takes his place. He is last heard broadcasting a sermon over the rocket's radio.

Main cast

 Peter Sellers as the Reverend John Edward Smallwood
 Cecil Parker as Archdeacon Aspinall
 Isabel Jeans as Lady Lucy Despard
 Ian Carmichael as the Other Smallwood
 Bernard Miles as Simpson
 Brock Peters as Matthew Robinson
 Eric Sykes as Harry Smith
 Irene Handl as Rene Smith
 Miriam Karlin as Winnie Smith
 Josephine Woodford as Doris Smith
 Joan Miller as Mrs. Smith-Gould
 Miles Malleson as Rockeby
 Eric Barker as Bank Manager
 William Hartnell as Major Fowler, town councillor
 Roy Kinnear as Fred Smith
 Joan Hickson as Housewife
 Kenneth Griffith as Reverend Owen Thomas
 Mark Eden as Sir Geoffrey Despard
 John Comer as Butcher
 Basil Dignam as Prison Governor
 Franklin Engelmann as TV Commentator
 Colin Gordon as Prime Minister
 Geoffrey Hibbert as Council Official
 Joan Heal as Disgruntled Housewife
 Ludovic Kennedy as himself
 Margery Lawrence as Quarrelling Housewife
 Harry Locke as Shop Steward
 Henry Longhurst as Deaf Man
 Malcolm Muggeridge as Cleric
 Derek Nimmo as Director-Generals Assistant
 Conrad Phillips as P.R.O.
 Nicholas Phipps as Director-General
 Cardew Robinson as Tramp
 Gerald Sim as Store Manager
 Olive Sloane as Housewife
 Marianne Stone as Miss Palmer
 Elsie Wagstaff Lady on Parish Council
 Thorley Walters as Tranquilax Executive
 Ian Wilson as Salvation Army Major
 George Woodbridge as Bishop
 Drewe Henley as Doris's Boy Friend (uncredited)
 Ed Devereaux as Communication Officer (uncredited)
 
The cast includes several uncredited performers: A Hard Day's Night actor John Junkin, Rodney Bewes, who has a couple of lines as a milkman, and future Small Faces and Humble Pie singer Steve Marriott.  Sellers's performance is generally held to be outstanding, in a meatier, more dramatic role, similar to his work in I'm All Right Jack, released in 1959.

Reception
The film premiered in London on 23 May 1963 at the Columbia Cinema in Shaftesbury Avenue (today known as Curzon Soho), and although it disappointed the critic for The Times, who found it lacking the mild bite and satire of the Boulting-Sellers film I'm All Right Jack, it became one of the 12 most popular films in Britain in 1963.

Analysis
An article in Garden History likened the character of the Reverend John Smallwood to that of an 18th century picturesque guru William Gilpin: "The first act of the new reverend is to invite a group of colourful travellers to reside in the vicarage; the second is to convince an old lady to open her house and grounds to all sorts of poor vagabonds, scruffs and vagrants, characters who bring picturesque values to the noble scene. Eventually, a picturesque economic system based on free donation causes havoc in the village and the nation - the reverend is made a bishop and sent into space, in Britain's first spaceship. The film revives a character that one can safely imagine as a modern version of Doctor Syntax - cordial, dedicated, stubborn, fearless, not reacting against, but slightly diverging from, the established values of his culture."

Like other Boulting films, Heavens Above! satirises contemporary materialistic attitudes and cautiously espouses a socialist ethos, while also showing the possible deleterious side-effects of such ideas, and the all-too-human tendency to take advantage of naive generosity.

References

External links
 
 
 
 

1963 films
1963 comedy films
British comedy films
British satirical films
British black-and-white films
1960s English-language films
Films directed by John Boulting
Films directed by Roy Boulting
Films scored by Richard Rodney Bennett
Films about Christianity
Religion in the United Kingdom
1960s British films